The Fourth Municipality (In Italian: Quarta Municipalità or Municipalità 4) is one of the ten boroughs in which the Italian city of Naples is divided.

Geography
The municipality is located in central-eastern area of the city and includes the eastern branch of the Port of Naples.

Its territory includes the zones of Decumani, Centro Storico (historical center, partly included), Porta San Gennaro, Port'Alba, Porta Capuana, Borgo Sant'Antonio Abate, Vasto, Arenaccia, Ferrovia (railway), Sant'Erasmo, Rione Luzzatti, Rione Ascarelli, Rione Sant'Alfonso, Zona Cimiteriale (cemetery of Poggioreale) and Stadera.

Administrative division
The Fourth Municipality is divided into 4 quarters:

See also
Centro Direzionale

References

External links
 Municipalità 4 page on Naples website

Municipality 04